Mariscal Sucre was a Peruvian football club, located in the city of Lima.

The club was founded with the name of Sucre FC and was promoted to Primera Division Peruana in 1933, later was renamed Mariscal Sucre de Deportes in 1951. 

The club won the national tournament in 1944 and 1953.

In 1968, Mariscal Sucre was relegated when Centro Iqueño defeated them in a relegation playoff, and it was their last appearance in the Peruvian Primera Division.

Honours

National
Peruvian Primera División:
Winners: 1944, 1953
Runner-up: 1939, 1949

Peruvian Segunda División:
Winners: 1959, 1962, 1965
Runner-up: 1969

División Intermedia:
Winners (2): 1931, 1932

References

External links
 La difusión del fútbol en Lima (Spanish)
 Peruvian football seasons
 Mariscal Sucre de Deportes FBC.
 CD Mariscal Sucre.
 La difusión del fútbol en Lima (Spanish).
Galería de Equipos Peruanos - Parte 2.
 RSSSF - Peru - List of Champions.
 Peruvian football seasons.
Efemérides 1958:Despedida del Mariscal Sucre.
Efemérides 1958:Duelo Sport Boys vs Mariscal Sucre.
Mariscal Sucre, Campeón 1953.
Mariscal Sucre vs Universitario, 1945.
Emblema Mariscal Sucre/Sucre F.C..
Sucre F.C. insignia.
Mariscal Sucre vs Atlético Grau 1966.
Rodolfo Bazan , La Seleccion Juvenil 1954 y Mariscal Sucre. 

Football clubs in Lima